Carbis Cottage is a Grade II listed house at The Green, Chingford, London, E4 7EN.

It was probably built in the 17th century.

References

Grade II listed buildings in the London Borough of Waltham Forest
Grade II listed houses in London